Henle can refer to:
Friedrich Gustav Jakob Henle, a German physician, pathologist and anatomist (1809–1885)
 Loop of Henle in the kidney, named after Henle
Fritz Henle, a photographer, known as "Mr. Rollei" for his use of the 2.25" square format film used in the Rolleiflex camera
Günter Henle, German politician and music publisher
G. Henle Verlag, German music publishing house
Moritz Henle, a German composer
Robert A. Henle, an American electrical engineer
Robert J. Henle, the 46th President of Georgetown University